The following is a list of lieutenant governors of Ontario and the lieutenant governors of the former colony of Upper Canada.  The office of Lieutenant Governor of Ontario was created in 1867, when the Province of Ontario was created upon Confederation. The predecessor office, lieutenant governor of Upper Canada, was a British colonial officer, appointed by the British government to administer the government of the colony, from 1791 to 1841. (Prior to 1791, the territory which is now Ontario was part of the old Province of Quebec, which was administered by the colonial governors of the Province of Quebec.)

In 1841, the two provinces of Upper Canada and Lower Canada were abolished and merged into the new Province of Canada, with a single Parliament and Governor General.  Upper Canada was known as Canada West, but did not have a separate government or lieutenant governor. It was simply an administrative division of the Province of Canada.

Prior to Confederation, the lieutenant governors of Upper Canada were either British colonial administrators or British Army officers.  The first lieutenant governor of Ontario, General Sir Henry William Stisted, was the last British lieutenant governor. From 1868 onwards, only Canadians were appointed to the position.

Lieutenant governors of Upper Canada, 1791–1841

Lieutenant governors of Ontario, 1867–present

See also
 Office-holders of Canada
 Canadian incumbents by year

References

External links
 

Ontario
Lieutenant Governors